Auzatellodes hyalinata is a moth in the family Drepanidae. It was described by Frederic Moore in 1868. It is found in the north-eastern Himalayas, Sikkim, Burma and northern Yunnan in China.

Adults are purplish hyaline (glass like), the forewings with an imperfect basal and subbasal band with a discal point, and an irregular submarginal band with a reddish-brown inner or reverse discal point, crossing both the wings. The reddish-brown colour extends along the veins and the outer marginal border line, dividing a row of white lunules.

References

Moths described in 1868
Drepaninae
Moths of Asia